Marco Condori (born 26 March 1966) is a Bolivian long-distance runner. He competed in the men's marathon at the 2000 Summer Olympics. Condori also represented Bolivia in the 3000 metres steeplechase at the 1995 Pan American Games, finishing eighth.

References

External links

1966 births
Living people
Athletes (track and field) at the 2000 Summer Olympics
Bolivian male long-distance runners
Bolivian male marathon runners
Olympic athletes of Bolivia
Athletes (track and field) at the 1995 Pan American Games
Pan American Games competitors for Bolivia
World Athletics Championships athletes for Bolivia
Place of birth missing (living people)